Rosângela Conceição also known as Zanza is a former freestyle wrestling, judo, grappling and Brazilian Jiu-Jitsu (BJJ) competitor from Brazil. She was the first Brazilian woman to compete in Olympic wrestling at the 2008 Olympic Games and the first woman to win a BJJ world title.

Biography 
Rosângela da Silva Conceição was born on 7 August 1973 in the town of São Leopoldo, Brazil. She started training judo at a young age following in the footsteps of her older brother, looking to improve her ne-waza she started training Brazilian jiu-jitsu (BJJ) with Ricardo Murgel. In 1996 she was selected to act as reserve for Edinanci Silva at the 1996 Summer Olympics.
In 1998, while a purple belt, she competed in the very first women division of the CBJJ World Jiu Jitsu Championship. She became alongside Thaís Ramos, the first women BJJ world champion. In 1999 she won the Brazilian National Jiu-Jitsu Championship in both her division (heavy) and in open class.

Competing in freestyle wrestling she won bronze medal at the 2007 Pan American Games, securing a spot later at the 2008 Olympics. She retired in 2013, moved to Dubai, teaching jiu-jitsu as part of the grappling program in the UAE funded by Mohamed bin Zayed.

Championships and achievements

Brazilian jiu-jitsu 
Main Achievements (BJJ):
 World Champion (1998, 2003, 2005)
 Brazilian National Champion (1999 purple: absolute)
 ADCC South American Trials Champion (2009)
 Pan American Champion (1999 WO?)

Judo 
Main Achievements (Judo):
 Reserve Olympian at Atlanta Games (1996)

Wrestling 
Main Achievements (Wrestling):
 Pan American Bronze Medallist (2007)
 Olympian at Beijing Games (2008)
 Edmonton Open 3rd Place (2008)

References 

Living people
Brazilian female sport wrestlers
Brazilian practitioners of Brazilian jiu-jitsu
People awarded a black belt in Brazilian jiu-jitsu
Female Brazilian jiu-jitsu practitioners
Brazilian submission wrestlers
Olympic wrestlers of Brazil
Wrestlers at the 2007 Pan American Games
Wrestlers at the 2008 Summer Olympics
Pan American Games bronze medalists for Brazil
Pan American Games medalists in wrestling
South American Games gold medalists for Brazil
South American Games medalists in judo
1973 births
People from São Leopoldo
Competitors at the 2002 South American Games
Medalists at the 2007 Pan American Games
Sportspeople from Rio Grande do Sul
Brazilian jiu-jitsu world champions (women)
20th-century Brazilian women
21st-century Brazilian women